Epichorista siriana is a species of moth of the family Tortricidae. It is found in New Zealand.

The wingspan is 10.5–12 mm for males and about 14 mm for females. The forewings deep brownish ochreous, mixed with dark fuscous in males. The hindwings are blackish. In female, the forewings are reddish ochreous, with a few dark fuscous scales. The hindwings of the females are whitish.

References

Moths described in 1881
Epichorista
Moths of New Zealand